Sagittaria cristata, the crested arrowhead, is a plant species native to Ontario and north-central United States (Illinois, Iowa, Minnesota, Missouri, Nebraska, Wisconsin, Michigan). It grows in shallow water along the edges of lakes, streams and marshes.

Sagittaria cristata is a perennial herb up to 75 cm (30 inches) tall. Leaves are flat, long and narrow, not lobed, up to 40 cm (16 inches) long. Flowers are white.

References

External links
photo of herbarium specimen at Missouri Botanical Garden, lectotype of Sagittaria cristata
Michigan Flora, University of Michigan Herbarium, Sagittaria cristata
Wetland Plants of Wisconsin, Cofrin Center for Biodiversity, Sagittaria cristata Engelm.
Gardening Europe, Piantaggine d acqua, Sagittaria cristata Engelm. 

cristata
Plants described in 1883
Flora of North America
Freshwater plants